Pakistanis in India primarily consist of Pakistani Hindus and Sikhs who seek Indian citizenship and permanent settlement in India.
However, by extension, this figure also includes ethnic Pakistanis who migrated to the Dominion of India from Pakistan following the Partition of British India in 1947. Others include Muslim Pakistani nationals who desire Indian citizenship or seek to work in India as expatriates. In December 2015, Anglo–Pakistani singer Adnan Sami became a naturalized Indian citizen after living in India on an extended visitor visa since 2001. The state of Maharashtra has witnessed a six-fold increase in applications for Indian citizenship from Pakistani nationals following the relaxation and simplification of immigration rules in December 2017. The primary purpose of these applications was a result of cross-border marriages, which have resulted in spouses waiting for citizenship for close to a decade.

Additionally, there are also an estimated 761 Pakistani nationals imprisoned within Indian jails, most of them serving their terms on charges of espionage and terror-related crimes.

There are an extensive number of Pakistanis illegally overstaying in India. In 2017, 250 illegal Pakistani immigrants were deported from India.

Notable individuals
 Hindu Singh Sodha, Human rights and refugee rights activist 
Ram Singh Sodho, former member of the Provincial Assembly of Sindh 
 Adnan Sami, Pakistan-born musician

See also
 India–Pakistan relations
 Baloch people in India
 Sindhis in India
 Indians in Pakistan
 Partition of India

References

Ethnic groups in India
Immigration to India
 
India